The Collegiate Basilica of Santa Maria of Xàtiva, also known as La Seu, is the principal church of the city of Xàtiva (Valencia), Spain. The construction commenced in 1596.

In this Collegiate Basilica of Xàtiva different members of the House of Borgia are buried. At the museum is possible to see  the altarpiece of the cardinal Alfonso Borgia and a silver chalice with the name of the Pope Calixtus III and another artworks of the Borgia family.

See also 

 Route of the Borgias

References

External links 

 Website of the Collegiate Basilica of Xàtiva 
 The Collegiate Basilica at Xativa Tourism 
 File at the Valencian Heritage Library
 Website in Valencian Heritage
 Web information
 Webcam: Square of La Seu

Route of the Borgias
Bien de Interés Cultural landmarks in the Province of Valencia
 
Herrerian architecture
16th-century Roman Catholic church buildings in Spain
Renaissance architecture in the Valencian Community